A constitutional referendum was held in Peru on 9 December 2018 alongside the second round of gubernatorial elections.

The referendum, originally proposed by President Martín Vizcarra, saw three of four proposals accepted. The final proposal of a bicameral congress was denied after Vizcarra withdrew his support following modifications during congressional approval that would have resulted with weaker presidential powers.

Background

Odebrecht scandal 
Following the Odebrecht scandal which saw four of Peru's former presidents involved in corruption scandals, Peruvians demanded government accountability regarding corruption. President Martín Vizcarra following the resignation of President Kuczynski stated upon being sworn in on 23 March 2018  that Peruvians have "had enough" of corruption, promising to lead an anti-corruption movement in Peru.

Vizcarra-Fujimorista relations 
Since being a minister, Vizcarra faced opposition from Fujimoristas. The Fujimorista movement was led by Keiko Fujimori, daughter of Alberto Fujimori, a former Peruvian president imprisoned for corruption and crimes against humanity.

Upon Vizcarra's entrance into the office of the presidency, the Fujimoristas, which held the majority of seats within the Congress of the Republic of Peru, immediately began to oppose Vizcarra's projects.

Process

Proposal 
Months after being sworn in, Vizcarra called for a constitutional referendum on 28 July 2018 to prohibit private funding for political campaigns, to ban the reelection of lawmakers and to recreate a bicameral congress.

Congress immediately attempted to prevent judicial and congressional reform from occurring and initially created delays in the process. Due to these actions, Vizcarra raised a motion of no confidence threatening the closure of congress. As a result, congress began the approval process for the referendum.

Congressional approval 
The first reform approved by Fujimori-led congress on 18 September 2018 would see the National Council of the Magistrature renamed the National Board of Justice. The way its members are appointed would also be changed, with new members chosen by a special commission headed by the Attorney General, the Comptroller General, the president of the constitutional tribunal, the president of the judicial branch and the Public Defender through a public contest.

The second reform approved by Congress, on 26 September, was an amendment to article 35 of the constitution regulating political party finances, introducing audits and penalties for illegal donations.

After the temporary detention of Keiko Fujimori on 10 October, legislators belonging to American Popular Revolutionary Alliance and the Fujimorista-led Popular Force introduced a bill the following day on 11 October 2018 to modify Vizcarra's referendum proposals with their own suggestions to the public.

Later in October, the third proposal approved introduced a term limit of one consecutive term for members of Congress–left largely unchanged from Vizcarra's original proposal–while the fourth and final proposal included making Congress a bicameral legislature with 130 deputies and 50 senators. This final proposal was modified by the Fujimoristas in congress to weaken the power of the presidency and President Vizcarra quickly withdrew his support from creating a bicameral congress.

Final questions
The final referendum questions were:
Do you approve the constitutional reform on the conformation and functions of the National Board of Justice, formerly the National Council of the Magistracy?
Do you approve the constitutional reform that regulates the financing of political organizations?
Do you approve the constitutional reform that prohibits the immediate re-election of parliamentarians of the Republic?
Do you approve the constitutional reform that establishes the bicamerality in the Congress of the Republic?

Preliminary results
Voters ultimately accepted the first three referendum proposals, rejecting the final proposal of establishing a bicameral congress that President Vizcarra had withdrawn his support from after the Fujimorista-controlled congress amended the proposal.

Reactions 
President Vizcarra and analysts agreed that the referendum was just the first step of combating corruption that has been well-established in Peru. Vizcarra also highlighted that the election occurred on International Anti-Corruption Day and the anniversary of the 1824 Battle of Ayacucho, which sealed independence for not only Peru, but for the entire South American continent. Gestión stated that results were a victory for Vizcarra while on the other hand, Peruvians had "harshly punished Congress".

References

Referendums in Peru
2018 in Peru
Peru